Artavan is a village in the Vayk Municipality of the Vayots Dzor Province of Armenia. The village was probably at one time a fief of Tatev. There is an 18th-century bridge and an old cemetery in the vicinity of the village.

Etymology 
The village was previously known as Dzhul.

Gallery

References

External links 

 
 
 

Populated places in Vayots Dzor Province